Nour Issam Ardakani (born November 30, 2001) is a Lebanese singer, dancer and model. She currently represents Lebanon and the MENA region in Now United, a global pop group founded by Spice Girls manager Simon Fuller.

Career

2020 - present - Now United 
She was announced as the 16th member of the global pop group Now United on 21 September 2020 as Lebanon's representative, participated in the group's auditions and competed as a finalist with Ayla (علياء in Arabic), from the United Arab Emirates.

Before joining Now United, Nour had a band with her friends called Front Row.

Her first song as a member of Now United was Habibi. She later released the Arabic version of the song called حبيبي (Habibi in Arabic).

With the group and at the age of 19, Nour was the first Lebanese to be nominated for Meus Prêmios Nick, the Brazilian version of Nickelodion's Kids' Choice Awards.
Nour went on a global tour with Now United since March 11th,2022 (Wave Your Flag World Tour).

Interviews and editorials 
Nour was considered "arguably the biggest Gen Z role model in the Arab world" by Cosmopolitan Midde East in the article Nour Ardakani Is Putting Up a Now United Front. She has also been interviewed by ET Arabia, The Insider, MTV Lebanon, Jornal Al Khaleej, Al Arabiya and Al Jadeed.

Some major music websites such as Variety, The National News, a NBC and Harper's Bazaar Arabia covered Nour's performance and her career.

Personal life 
Nour currently lives with her mother, father, and two siblings, Jad and Ryan, in her birthplace.

She is fluent in Arabic, English and French. She studied Nutrition and Business at the American University of Beirut.

She also composes songs, plays the piano, ukulele and is currently learning to play the guitar.

Discography

Now United

Awards and nominees

References 

Lebanese women pop singers
Lebanese female dancers
Lebanese female models
2001 births
Living people
Now United members